Palaemon floridanus is a species of shrimp of the family Palaemonidae.

References

Palaemonidae
Crustaceans described in 1942